Roberto Navarro Muñoz (born 12 April 2002) is a Spanish professional footballer who plays as a midfielder for Real Sociedad.

Career

Early career
Navarro was born in Barcelona, Catalonia, but moved to Pamplona, Navarre at an early age. He started playing football with local side CA Osasuna before joining FC Barcelona at age 11, living with his maternal grandparents.

Monaco
On 3 July 2018, Navarro signed with AS Monaco FC. He made his senior debut for the club in a 1–0 Coupe de France win over Canet Roussillon FC on 6 January 2019, and at 16 years and 8 months was their youngest ever senior debutant.

Real Sociedad
On 2 September 2019, Navarro signed a professional contract with Real Sociedad for three years, being initially assigned to the reserves in Segunda División B. He made his first team – and La Liga – debut on 16 December 2020, replacing Ander Guevara in a 1–2 away loss against FC Barcelona.

Ahead of the 2021–22 season, Real Sociedad director of football Roberto Olabe announced that Navarro and Sanse teammate Jon Pacheco were promoted to the main squad. In January 2022, Navarro was demoted back to the B-team, due to the arrival of Rafinha for six-month loan duties at the first team.

On 7 August 2022, Navarro returned to the first team, being assigned the number 17 jersey.

Personal life
Navarro's father Roberto was also a professional footballer. A defender, he notably represented third tier sides CA Osasuna B, UE Sant Andreu and CE L'Hospitalet.

References

External links
 Profile at the Real Sociedad website
 
 
 

2002 births
Living people
Footballers from Barcelona
Footballers from Pamplona
Spanish footballers
Association football midfielders
La Liga players
Segunda División players
Segunda División B players
Real Sociedad footballers
Real Sociedad B footballers
Championnat National 2 players
AS Monaco FC players
Spain youth international footballers
Spain under-21 international footballers
Spanish expatriate footballers
Expatriate footballers in Monaco
Spanish expatriates in Monaco